Elliott William Barnes Sadler (born April 30, 1975) is an American former professional stock car racing driver. He last competed part-time in the NASCAR Xfinity Series, driving the No. 10 Chevrolet Camaro for Kaulig Racing. Sadler is one of 36 drivers who have at least one win in each of NASCAR's top three series. Sadler was born in Emporia, Virginia; he is the younger brother of former NASCAR driver Hermie Sadler.

Racing career

Early racing career
Sadler began racing in go-karts at the age of seven, and moved up to the Late Model stock car division at the local race track. His accomplishments include over 200 total wins, the 1983–84 Virginia State Karting Championship, and the North Carolina Gold Cup in 1991–92.

When he turned 18, he moved to the Winston Racing Series and ran full-time beginning in 1993. That same year, he achieved his first victory. In 1995, he was crowned track champion at South Boston Speedway, winning 13 races including a 6-race winning streak.

Despite finding success in late model racing, Sadler was having a hard time catching the eye of NASCAR team owners. He sold all of his racing equipment to buy a Busch Series car, and ran some races as an independent in 1995 and early 1996. A race at Hickory Motor Speedway in early 1996 formed a connection between Sadler and Diamond Ridge Motorsports, the team he would drive for in late 1996 and all of 1997 and 1998 in the Busch Series.

Wood Brothers Racing

Sadler moved up to the Cup Series full-time in 1999, driving the No. 21 Ford Taurus for Wood Brothers Racing. His best finish that year was 10th at Texas Motor Speedway, and he finished 24th in points, runner-up to Tony Stewart for Rookie of the Year honors. He also returned to the Busch Series on a part-time basis, filling in for the injured Andy Santerre for Innovative Motorsports, his best finish being fifth at California Speedway. He also drove a handful of races for Lyndon Amick. Sadler's only Top 10 finish in 2000 was 7th at Bristol, after failing to qualify at Talladega Superspeedway, and he dropped to 29th in points. He also had a wild flip at Michigan Speedway after cutting a tire in practice.

In 2001, Sadler won his first Cup race at Bristol, making this the first win for Wood Brothers in eight years. He had another Top 10 run and finished 20th in points. After seven Top 10s and a fall to 23rd in points in 2002, Sadler left for Robert Yates Racing to drive the No. 38 M&M's Ford, replacing Ricky Rudd.

Robert Yates Racing

In 2003, his first season of competition with Robert Yates, Sadler won the pole at both Darlington Raceway and Talladega Superspeedway and finished 22nd in points. That year, he had a vicious crash at Talladega after near-contact with Dale Earnhardt Jr. and touched the right-front fender of Kurt Busch. His car flew into the air, flipped twice, landed on his roof, spun towards the banking, and flipped six times. Sadler emerged uninjured (although he was airlifted to a local hospital for precautionary reasons).

Sadler started the 2004 season with a Top 10 finish in the Daytona 500 and six races later, he won at Texas Motor Speedway for his second career win. He stayed in the Top 10 in points all season and won at California Speedway, beating Kasey Kahne and Mark Martin. He made the Chase and finished a career-high ninth in the championship points standings. He had another flip-crash at Talladega on the final lap after he spun out and blew over onto his roof and landed on all 4 wheels and crossed the finish line in 22nd just in front of his brother Hermie. Sadler also was uninjured in that crash, and he was even able to drive his car back to the garage.

Sadler failed to win a race again in the 2005 season; however, he did clinch four poles and finished 13th in the points standings. He also made 16 starts for Robert Yates in the Busch Series, driving the No. 90 Taurus, and had three Top 5 finishes. In 2006, Sadler won the pole at Talladega and finished 22nd in points. He made seven starts in the Busch Series and his best finish was second at Richmond. After a lack of results, he left RYR midway through 2006 for Gillett Evernham Motorsports.
Sadler, was also the cover driver for EA Sports’ NASCAR 07.

Evernham/Petty Motorsports

Before the start of the 2007 Daytona 500, Sadler's team was among many others who faced disciplinary action for rule-infractions. Despite being docked 25 points, he still went on to score a season best sixth-place finish. Sadler had many ups and downs throughout the season. In 2007, Sadler led 62 laps, posted two Top 10 finishes and finished 25th in points. Sadler had the longest streak without a DNF than any other driver before failing to finish a race in 2007.

Sadler struggled in 2008, garnering only two Top 5's, eight Top 10's, and 16 Top 20's. He had four DNF's and 12 finishes of 30th or worse. Sadler led 21 laps in 2008, his fewest since the 2000 season. He ended the year 24th in the points standings.

In December 2008, it was reported that A. J. Allmendinger would replace Sadler in the No. 19 Best Buy-sponsored Dodge for Gillett Evernham Motorsports in 2009. Sadler threatened a lawsuit for breach of contract; however, the lawsuit was dropped after the GEM – Petty Enterprises merger and he returned to the ride for 2009.

After all of the offseason issues, Sadler found himself in the No. 19 Stanley Tools-sponsored Dodge for Richard Petty Motorsports in the 2009 Sprint Cup Series season.  In the 2009 Daytona 500, Sadler took the lead on lap 123 and stayed in the lead for the final stages in the race. On the last green flag lap Sadler got passed by Matt Kenseth and seconds later the caution came out. Kenseth wound up finishing first while Sadler came up in fifth. He ended the year 26th in points.

In 2010, Sadler returned to RPM to drive the No. 19 Ford with sponsorship from Stanley, Best Buy, and the United States Air Force. During the year, however, Sadler announced that he would be leaving the team after the 2010 season. He ran a part-time schedule in the Camping World Truck Series in the No. 2 Hunt Brothers Pizza-sponsored Chevrolet Silverado for Kevin Harvick Incorporated. In this ride, Sadler won his first NASCAR race in six years at Pocono in the Pocono Mountains 125 in July. Sadler also made a one-off start for JR Motorsports in the No. 88 Chevrolet at the Dover 200 Nationwide Series event, finishing 31st after being involved in an accident during the early stages of the race.

The next day, Sadler was involved in a wreck where he hit the inside fence (a blind spot on the track, not well-recorded by video cameras) after being hit from behind by A. J. Allmendinger. Kurt Busch was hit from behind by Jimmie Johnson causing him to spin into Clint Bowyer who received little damage but still finished 12th.  The wreck was so horrific it threw the engine away from the car and caused the race to be red-flagged for 25 minutes to clean up the wreck. There were several reports by fans that his car flew through the air.  With a grimace on his face, he climbed out of the car and laid down on the track. He was taken to the medical facility where he later emerged and gave an interview to on hand media personnel. He said he was fine & was a little sore, but had the breath knocked out of him and had taken "the hardest hit of his career" at Pocono. He was proud of his team back home that had built a safe car and of the pit crew and of all of the hard work they had put into the race thus far. On August 3, Sadler announced on NASCAR Now that NASCAR told him it was the hardest head-on crash ever recorded in NASCAR history. On November 5, 2010, Sadler won the pole for the AAA Texas 500 at Texas Motor Speedway qualifying at 195.397, the fastest qualifying speed since 1999.

KHI and RCR

In late-2010, Sadler was at a crossroads in his career. He admitted in an interview that he wasn't enjoying the sport any longer. He had gone winless for 6 seasons, and was making no progress in his efforts to winning a championship. By the persuasion of former teammate Dale Jarrett, Sadler stepped down from the Cup Series to try to make a living in the lower-divisions.

On November 5, 2010. Sadler announced a two-year deal to drive the No. 2 OneMain Financial-sponsored Chevrolet for Kevin Harvick Inc. in the Nationwide Series and also will drive a selected number of races in the Camping World Truck Series. Sadler took the championship points lead in the Nationwide Series after the eleventh race in the 2011 season. He ended up finishing second in points with 24 Top 10 finishes in 34 events.

At the end of the 2011 season, KHI's Nationwide Series operations were absorbed by Richard Childress Racing and Sadler moved to RCR for 2012, remaining in the No. 2. In addition, Sadler ran in the 2012 Daytona 500 for RCR in the No. 33 Chevrolet,.

On March 3, 2012, Sadler won the Nationwide Series Bashas' Supermarkets 200 at Phoenix, his first win since October 31, 1998 at North Carolina Motor Speedway, a span of 91 races.

Sadler had been announced on March 3 as the third driver of the Michael Waltrip Racing's No. 55 Toyota, but Childress wanted Sadler to focus on the Nationwide championship, so the deal was nixed.

On March 17, Sadler won at Bristol, making it the first year since the mid-1990s that the first four NNS races have been won by non-Sprint Cup drivers. It also had Sadler winning two of the first four races of the season.

On July 22, Sadler held off hard charging Ricky Stenhouse Jr. at Chicagoland Speedway to collect his third win of the season, and held on to his point lead over Stenhouse and Austin Dillon.

Sadler got black flagged after supposedly jumping the restart at the inaugural Indiana 250. Elliott's point lead vanished nearly after the black flag. The week after he dominated the U.S. Cellular 250 at Iowa en route to his fourth win of the year. Heading into Phoenix, Sadler was once again caught up in a late crash, which ended his championship hopes. He would finish second in points again to Stenhouse. He would later announce his move to Joe Gibbs Racing for 2013, taking OneMain Financial with him.

Joe Gibbs Racing

In addition to running the full Nationwide Series schedule for Joe Gibbs Racing, Sadler announced in March that he would be competing in three Sprint Cup Series events for the team, driving the No. 81 Toyota. Sadler ran one race with Alert Energy before it and other Caffeine gums were pulled from the market. He attempted Talladega with Doublemint but failed to qualify due to rain and not entered in fall race with no reasons.

At Loudon in 2013, Sadler was running in the top ten with 10 laps left in the race. With 6 laps to go, Sadler pulled a block on Regan Smith. The two drivers got contact that sent Sadler around into the grasses. After the race ended, Sadler and Smith argued on pit road with Sadler vowing to Smith that "you will not win this championship mark my words.". Although Smith apologized, their rivalry was renewed during the inaugural race at the Mid-Ohio Sports Car Course a few weeks later, when Smith passed Sadler for a spot through contact. When Sadler was running behind Smith a few laps later, Sadler retaliated, sending Smith into a crash collecting Ron Fellows. After medical issues forced Brian Vickers to sit out the end of the 2013 racing season, Sadler was named to drive the No. 55 MWR for the final four Sprint Cup races of 2013.

After going winless, he won the 2014 Aaron's 312 after defending Chris Buescher and Regan Smith, It was his first win since 2012 and his first with Gibbs.

On October 31, 2014, it was announced Sadler would join Roush Fenway Racing in the No. 1 for 2015,. During the O'Reilly Auto Parts Challenge, Sadler became ill and exited the car during the first caution. He was relieved by Clint Bowyer.

Roush Fenway Racing

On October 30, 2014, Roush Fenway Racing announced that Sadler would drive the No. 1 car in the Xfinity Series in 2015. This marked Sadler's reunion with former owner and engine builder Doug Yates, and his fourth stint with manufacturer Ford. In that season he got 4 top 5s and 17 top 10s, although he did not get a win that season, and finished 6th in the standings.

JR Motorsports
On October 2, 2015, Dale Earnhardt Jr. announced that Sadler would drive for JR Motorsports in the Xfinity Series in 2016. This marked the fifth team Sadler has joined since the 2011 season when he competed for Kevin Harvick Inc. His journey has taken him from KHI to Richard Childress Racing (2012), Joe Gibbs Racing (2013–2014), Roush Fenway and now JRM. On January 6, 2016, Sadler's car number was officially revealed as No. 1.

Sadler started out his season with a few top tens. Sadler ultimately broke through at the Sparks Energy 300 at Talladega. On the final lap, it looked like Sadler was set to being the runner-up. Sadler battled Joey Logano on the final lap. When Logano blocked, he spun out from contact from Elliott. Elliott dipped below the yellow line to avoid a spinning Joey. Brennan Poole passed Sadler for the lead just as a caution came out. After a 5-minute delay, with both drivers, Poole and Sadler, waiting on the front-stretch for NASCAR's word, NASCAR ultimately determined that Sadler had been ahead at the moment of caution, dropping Poole to third, and elevating Sadler to first place. The finish was a 1–2 finish for JR Motorsports with Sadler winning and teammate Justin Allgaier finishing second.

Sadler would return to Victory lane at Darlington in the VFW Sport Clips Help A Hero 200, beating out Denny Hamlin. The two wins would automatically lock Sadler in the inaugural Xfinity Chase. Sadler was one of three drivers starting the chase with wins. In round one, Sadler won the race at Kentucky. Sadler, with a few more top tens, moved on to the championship four at Homestead-Miami Speedway. Sadler went on to score a runner-up finish in the championship for the third time in his career.

In 2017, Sadler returned to the Cup Series part-time with Tommy Baldwin Racing, driving the No. 7 in the Daytona 500. His last start in the Cup series was late in 2013. As one of the two fastest non-chartered cars in qualifying, he was able to lock himself into the race before the Can-Am Duels. He ended up qualifying for the next 2 plate races at Talladega in May and then Daytona in July and was going to drive in the Coca-Cola 600, but gave the ride to J. J. Yeley for an unknown reason.

In his 800th NASCAR start at Iowa's American Ethanol E15 250, Sadler came back from the rear of the field and ended up having a great night, but was still unable to get his first win of the season. He had a great shot to win Daytona but could not, instead pushing teammate William Byron past the overtime line as a crash took place, sealing the win for Byron.

Sadler clinched the first NASCAR Xfinity Series Regular Season Championship with a fifth-place finish in the Go Bowling 250 at Richmond Raceway.

Sadler entered the night with a 91-point edge over JR Motorsports teammate William Byron and needed to come out of the race ahead by at least 61 points in the standings. Sadler finished the race 95 points ahead of Byron. Sadler was officially awarded the championship trophy and the 15 bonus points towards the NASCAR playoffs the following weekend at Chicagoland Speedway; the final race of the regular season. Despite not winning a single regular-season race, Sadler led the series with 11 top fives, an average finish of 9.5, and spent all but two weeks on top of the points standings. Sadler entered the playoffs as the third seed behind William Byron and Justin Allgaier and scored his 4th runner-up finish in the championship despite going winless. On February 17, 2018, he finished second to Tyler Reddick at Daytona International Speedway for the PowerShares QQQ 300 with a margin of 0.0004 seconds.

Sadler won the 2018 NASCAR Xfinity Series Most Popular Driver, making him the driver to win the most Most Popular Driver awards in Xfinity Series history, with four Most Popular Driver wins, winning it in 2011, 2016, 2017, and 2018.

Kaulig Racing

On August 15, 2018, Sadler announced that he would retire from full-time competition at the end of the 2018 Xfinity Series season. He transitioned to a part-time schedule in NASCAR in 2019, joining Kaulig Racing for a two-race Xfinity slate in 2019 at Richmond and Las Vegas.

The 2019 Rhino Pro Truck Outfitters 300 at Las Vegas was his final start in the NASCAR national series. Driving a No. 10 designed after his 1993 late model, Sadler finished tenth.

Personal life
Sadler was a six-sport athlete in high school at Brunswick Academy, participating in football, basketball, baseball, cross country, soccer, and golf. He was recruited by over 20 universities to play college basketball, and ended up accepting a basketball scholarship from James Madison University in Harrisonburg, Virginia. However, he injured his knee before his freshman season and needed two surgeries, eventually quitting college to focus on racing.  Sadler is heavily involved in the Autism Speaks charity.

He was the cover athlete on EA Sports NASCAR 07 and was also on the special edition NASCAR 09.

Sadler is married to Amanda and they have two children.

Motorsports career results

NASCAR
(key) (Bold – Pole position awarded by qualifying time. Italics – Pole position earned by points standings or practice time. * – Most laps led.)

Monster Energy Cup Series

Daytona 500

Xfinity Series

Camping World Truck Series

 Season still in progress.
 Ineligible for series championship points.

References

Elliott Sadler Bio
 Elliot Sadler going to Evernham Motorsports
Evernham Motorsports confirms Elliot Sadler as driver at Michigan
Silly Saga: Elliot Sadler going to Evernham

External links

 
 
 Hermie & Elliott Sadler Foundation for Autism

1975 births
NASCAR drivers
Racing drivers from Virginia
People from Emporia, Virginia
Living people
Robert Yates Racing drivers
Evernham Motorsports drivers
Richard Childress Racing drivers
Joe Gibbs Racing drivers
RFK Racing drivers
JR Motorsports drivers
NASCAR Xfinity Series regular season champions
Michael Waltrip Racing drivers